The Society of Dance History Scholars (SDHS) was a professional organization for dance historians in the United States and internationally. Founded in 1978, it became a non-profit in 1983. SDHS became a member of the American Council of Learned Societies in 1996, hosted an annual conference, published conference proceedings and a book series, and presented awards to new and established scholars. In 2017 it merged with the Congress on Research in Dance to form the Dance Studies Association (DSA).

The Society included scholars in musicology, anthropology, history, literature, theatre, performance studies, and other fields. Many members combined research and performance, and SDHS welcomed graduate students, as well as more seasoned scholars, among its members. The society also contained several working groups, which met at the annual conference. SDHS had close ties with its peer organizations such as the Congress on Research in Dance (CORD).

Since 1988 the Society published a periodical, Studies in Dance History, which was redefined as a monograph series in 1994. It included various scholarly texts in dance history and was published by the University of Wisconsin Press.

Awards offered
 de la Torre Bueno Prize
 Gertrude Lippincott Award
 Selma Jeanne Cohen Award

Conferences
Descriptions of these conferences, as well as listings for more recent and upcoming conferences, which as of 2017 are hosted by the Dance Studies Association, are available at the DSA website.
 2017 Dancing East Asia: Critical Choreographies and Their Corporeal Politics" April 7–8, University of Michigan, Ann Arbor, Michigan. Special topics conference.
 2016 "Beyond Authenticity & Appropriation: Bodies, Authorship, and Choreographies of Transmission" November 3–6, Pomona College, Claremont, California. Joint conference with CORD.
 2016 "Contemporary Ballet: Exchanges, Connections, and Directions" May 20–21, New York City, New York. Special topics conference.
 2015 "Cut and Paste: Dance Advocacy in the Age of Austerity" June 4–7, Athens, Greece. Joint conference with CORD.
 2015 "Dance as Experience: Progressive Era Origins and Legacies" March 26–28, Baltimore, Maryland. Special topics conference.
 2014 "Writing Dancing/Dancing Writing" November 13–16, University of Iowa, Iowa City, Iowa. Joint conference with CORD.
 2013 "Dance ACTions—Traditions and Transformations" June 8–11, Norwegian University of Science and Technology, Trondheim, Norway.
 2013 "Sacre Celebration: Revisiting, Reflecting, Revisioning" April 18–20, York University, Toronto, Canada. Special topics conference.
 2012 "Dance and the Social City" June 14–17, University of the Arts, Philadelphia, Pennsylvania. 
 2011 "Dance Dramaturgy: Catalyst, Perspective and Memory" June 23–26, York University, Toronto, Canada.
 2010 "Dance & Spectacle" July 8–11, University of Surrey, Guilford and The Place, London, UK.
 2009 "Topographies: Sites, Bodies, Technologies" June 19–22, Stanford University and San Francisco, California. Conference held in conjunction with DCA.
 2008 "Look Back/Moving Forward" June 12–15, Skidmore College, Saratoga Springs, New York.
 2007 "Re-Thinking Practice and Theory/Repenser pratique et théorie" June 21–24, Le Centre National de la Danse, Paris, France.
 2006 "Grounding Moves: Landscapes for Dance" June 15–18, The Banff Centre, Alberta, Canada.
 2005 "Dancing from the Center" June 9–12, Northwestern University, Evanston, Illinois.
 2004 "Celebrating Dance: Celebrating History" June 17–20, Duke University, Durham, North Carolina.
 2003 "Dance History on Shannon’s Shore" June 26–29, University of Limerick, located on the river Shannon in County Limerick, Ireland.
 2002 annual conference, June 20–23, Temple University, Philadelphia, Pennsylvania.
 2001 "In the Moment" June 21–24, Goucher College, Towson, Maryland.
 2000 "Dancing in the Millennium" July 19–23, Washington Marriott Hotel, Washington, DC. Joint participation with twenty organizations.
 1999 annual conference, June 10–13, University of New Mexico, Albuquerque, New Mexico.
 1998 annual conference, June 18–21, University of Oregon, Eugene, Oregon.
 1997 " '79-'97: Reflecting on Our Past, Reflecting on Our Future" June 19–22, Barnard College, New York, New York.
 1996 "Speaking of History: Dance Scholarship in the '90's" June 13–16, University of Minnesota, Minneapolis, Minnesota.
 1995 "Border Crossings" May 10–14, Ryerson Polytechnic University, Toronto, Canada. Joint conference with the ADUCC (Association for Dance in Universities and Colleges in Canada).
 1994 "Retooling the Discipline: Research and Teaching Strategies for the 21st Century" February 10–13, Brigham Young University, Provo, Utah.
 1993 "Of, By and For the People; How Dance Proclaims Political Ideals, Ethnicity, Social Class, Age Group Identification, and Regional Pride" June 11–13, Hosted by the Dance Collection, New York Public Library for the Performing Arts, New York, New York. Joint conference with CORD, including participation of ADG, DCA and NYPL Performing Arts Dance Collection.
 1992 "American Dance Abroad: Influence of the United States Dance Experience Around the World" February 14–16, University of California-Riverside, Riverside, California.
 1991 "Dance in Hispanic Cultures" February 8–10, New World School of the Arts, Miami, Florida.
 1990 "Contemporary Issues in Dance a Global View" July 15–28, Hong Kong Academy for Performing Arts, Hong Kong, China. The Fifth Hong Kong International Dance Conference: a joint effort with over twenty international organizations.
 1989 "American Choreographers Today and Yesterday: Regional Influences" February 17–19, Arizona State University, Tempe, Arizona.
 1988 "Ballet Russe: 1909-1962" February 12–14, North Carolina School of the Arts, Winston-Salem, North Carolina.
 1987 "Isadora Duncan and Her Context" February 13–15, University of California-Irvine, Irvine, California. 
 1986 "Mary Wigman" February 14–17, City College, New York, New York.
 1985 "Antony Tudor" February 15–17, University of New Mexico, Albuquerque, New Mexico.
 1984 "Interdisciplinary Perspectives" February 17–19, Goucher College, Towson, Maryland.
 1983 "Methods and Resources in Dance History" February 11–14, Ohio State University, Columbus, Ohio.
 1982 annual conference, February 13–15, Harvard University, Cambridge, Massachusetts. Note: This conference did not have a specific theme, but the program is mistakenly entitled the "Fourth Annual Conference."
 1981 "A Bicentennial Celebration: Dance as Social and Popular Entertainment" June 22–28, University of California-Los Angeles, Los Angeles, California. Joint conference with ADG and CORD.
 1980 "Western Dance History" February 15–17, Barnard College, New York, New York.
 1979 "Western Dance History: Resources and Teaching Methods" February 16–18, Barnard College, New York, New York.
 1978 "Dance History Education on the College Level" 8 April, Trinity College, Hartford, Connecticut.

Working Groups
 Dance History Teachers
 Early Dance
 Dance and Technology
 Dancing the long nineteenth century
 Popular, Social and Vernacular Dance
 Practice-as-Research
 Latin American, Latino and Caribbean Dance Studies
 Students in SDHS

Notes

References
 A Brief History of SDHS (Society of Dance History Scholars) 
 A Brief History of CORD (Congress on Research in Dance)

Dance historians
Dance education organizations
1978 establishments in the United States
Member organizations of the American Council of Learned Societies
Historical societies of the United States
Organizations established in 1978